The Province of Yucatan, or the Captaincy General, Governorate, Intendancy, or Kingdom of Yucatan, was a first-order administrative district of the Viceroyalty of New Spain in the Yucatan peninsula.

Geography

The Yucatan peninsula is a low-lying, tropical, karstic platform of circa 300,000 km2 (115,831 sq mi), bound by the Gulf of Mexico and the Caribbean Sea.

History

Sixteenth century

Prior to the Spanish conquest 

The Yucatan peninsula encompassed various kuchkabalo'ob or Postclassic Mayan states.<ref
group=note>The number and nature of the Postclassic Mayan states is still debated.
</ref> At least some of these are believed to have previously been administrative districts of Chichen Itza and Mayapan.<ref
group=note>Chichen Itza was established by Itza settlers in circa 750–800 AD. It was the most powerful city-state in the Yucatan peninsula until circa 1050–1100 AD. It is believed to have sustained a successful programme of conquest during the tenth century, thereby bringing neighbouring inland settlements and key coastal ports under its dominion. It is commonly credited with (coercively) sponsoring the cult of K'uk'ulkan or Kukulkan, and the Postclassic peninsular coasting trade. The city-state of Mayapan succeeded Chichen Itza during k'atun 8 ahaw (either 1080–1104 AD or 1185–1204 AD), and ruled the peninsula for thirteen k'atuno'ob (either to 1392–1416 AD or 1441–1461 AD).
</ref>

Peninsular residents are thought to have first learnt of the Spanish in late 1502, after Christopher Columbus's landing at Guanaja in late July or early August 1502.<ref
group=note>Guanaja was a port of call in the peninsular coasting trade .
</ref> Spaniards are thought to have first reached the peninsula in the latter half of 1508, during a reconnaissance voyage by Juan Díaz de Solís and Vicente Yáñez Pinzón.<ref
group=note>The Magdalena, master Gonzalo Ruíz, and the Isabelita or the San Benito, master Pedro de Ledesma, sailed from Sanlúcar de Barrameda on 29 June 1508. The latter captain was the expedition's chief pilot, and had previously accompanied Christopher Columbus during his third and fourth voyages in 1498–1500 and 1502–1504.
</ref><ref
group=note>This voyage is known to have reached Guanaja in the Bay of Honduras, but there is disagreement as to whether the expedition then headed north to Cape Catoche or east to Cape Gracias a Dios.
</ref> The first Spanish residents of Yucatan were Jerónimo de Aguilar and Gonzalo Guerrero, who in 1511 had been swept towards the peninsula from their shipwreck at the Pedro Bank (southwest of Jamaica), and thereafter impressed or enslaved by a batab or mayor of the Ekab Province.

Hispano-Mayan hostilities broke out on 5 March 1517, when a Cuban expeditionary force, led by Francisco Hernández de Córdoba, was ambushed by the military or militia of the Ekab Province near that state's eponymous capital. The expeditionaries' reports of grand Mayan cities lead to further Cuban expeditions to Yucatan and the Gulf of Mexico, notably bringing about the 1519–1521 conquest of the Aztec Empire.

Spanish conquest 

On 8 December 1526, Charles I of Spain granted Francisco de Montejo a capitulación de conquista or letters patent for the conquest of the Mayan states in the Yucatan peninsula.<ref
group=note>The same had first been granted to Diego Velázquez de Cuéllar on 13 November 1518 . Both capitulaciones granted their recipients the titles and offices of adelantado, governor, and captain general of Yucatan.
</ref> The Salamancan conquistador was thereby granted the titles and offices of adelantado, governor, captain general, and alguacil mayor of Yucatan. Montejo, with four ships and over 250 men, embarked from Seville in late June 1527, reaching Cozumel (in the Ekab Province) in late September 1527.<ref
group=note>The ships were– (i) the San Jerónimo, Miguel Ferrer master, (ii) Nicolasa, Ochoa master, (iii) La Gavarra, master not named, and (iv) a fourth unnamed ship, master likewise not named. Montejo's principal subordinates were Alonso Dávila (second-in-command), Antón Sánchez Calabrés, Pedro de los Ríos, Pedro de Añasco, Pedro de Lugones, Pedro González, Hernando Palomino, Pedro Gaitán, and possibly Andrés de Calleja and Roberto Alemán. Crown representatives Pedro de Luna and Hernando de Cueto accompanied the expedition, as did frays Juan Rodríguez de Caraveo, Pedro Fernández, and Gregorio de San Martín. The flotilla was thoroughly refitted at Santo Domingo .
</ref> The Spanish conquest began in 1527, upon the founding of Salamanca de Xelha (in the Ekab Province), and protracted itself to 1544, ending with the founding of Salamanca de Bacalar (in the Waymil Province).<ref
group=note>There had been Hispano–Mayan engagements prior to the conquest, eg during the 1517 Hernández de Córdoba expedition . Additionally, the conquest did not bring all peninsular Mayan polities under Spanish rule, eg the Peten Itza Kingdom was not defeated until 13 March 1697 .
</ref><ref
group=note>By 31 December 1544, the (Spanish) Province of Yucatan consisted of four municipalities–
 San Francisco de Campeche or Campeachy– est. 4 October 1540 ,
 Merida, the provincial capital– est. 6 January 1542 ,
 Valladolid– est. 28 May 1543 ,
 Salamanca de Bacalar– est. 1544 .
</ref>

Posterior to the Spanish conquest

Great Mayan Revolt, 1546–1547

In 1546, state and local officers, and priests, of the (recently defeated) pre-Columbian province of Kupul began organising a coalition force for a swift military strike on Merida, Valladolid, and Bacalar. Six neighbouring (former) provinces joined Kupul in the operation, which was scheduled for the full moon night of 8–9 November 1546.<ref
group=note>Namely, Koch Wah, Sotuta, Tases, Waymil, Chetumal, and Chik'in Che'el .
</ref> On said night, circa 500–600 non-allied Mayans, and fifteen to twenty encomenderos were massacred.<ref
group=note>Casualties included persons not deemed fit for combat, eg women and children. At least some victims were ritualistically tortured and killed. Additionally, Spanish-owned cattle and pets, and non-native plants, were destroyed .
</ref> The planned offensive on Merida faltered, while that on Valladolid devolved into a siege, broken circa two weeks afterwards by a military detachment from Merida. The strike on Bacalar likewise devolved into a blockade, broken in early 1547. The defeated coalition forces nonetheless determined on guerrilla warfare. By March 1547, most coalition troops had been defeated, exhausted by attrition, or otherwise convinced to lay down their arms. Afterwards–
 five or six of the principal instigators were tried and killed,<ref
group=note>At least some instigators were burnt at the stake, including the Kupul chilam or priest, Anbal, who had been named the foremost principal instigator by Spaniards and defeated Mayans .
</ref>
 circa 2,000 prisoners of war were (illegally) enslaved,<ref
group=note>The New Laws of 20 November 1542 forbade the enslavement of natives . Francisco de Montejo, adelantado, governor and captain general of Spanish Yucatan, enforced this prohibition in the latter half of 1547, or in 1548 .
</ref>
 a number of Spanish military captains were charged with and convicted of war crimes.<ref
group=note>It is not clear what sentences the convicts received .
</ref>

Seventeenth century 

The Captaincy General of Yucatán was created in 1617 to provide more autonomy for the Yucatán Peninsula, previously ruled directly by a simple governor under the jurisdiction of Audiencia of Mexico. Its creation was part of the, ultimately futile, Habsburg attempt in the late 16th century to prevent incursion into the Caribbean by foreign powers, which also involved the establishment of Captaincies General in Puerto Rico, Cuba, and neighboring Guatemala. With the addition of the title of captain general to the governor of Yucatán, the province gained greater autonomy in administration and military matters. Unlike in most areas of Spanish America, no formal corregidores were used in Yucatán, and instead the governor-captain general relied on other subordinate officials to handle the oversight of local districts. The Captaincy General remained part of the Viceroyalty of New Spain, with the viceroy retaining the right to oversee the province's governance, when it was deemed necessary, and the Audiencia of Mexico taking judicial cases in appeal. The province and captaincy general covered the territory that today are the States of Campeche, Quintana Roo, Tabasco, Yucatán, and nominally  the northern areas of  Petén and Belize.

Law IV ("Que el Governador de Yucatan guarde las ordenes del Virrey de Nueva España") of Title I ("De los Terminos, Division, y Agregación de las Governaciones") of Book V of the Recopilación de Leyes de Indias of 1680 reproduces the November 2, 1627 royal decree (real cédula) of Philip V, which established the nature of the relationship between the Governor of Yucatán and the Viceroy of New Spain: "It is convenient that the governors and captain generals of the Province of Yucatán, precisely and in a timely manner fulfill the orders that the viceroys of New Spain give them. And we order that the governors obey them and fulfill them."

Eighteenth century 

In 1786, as part of the Bourbon Reforms the Spanish Crown established an Intendancy of Yucatán covering the same area as the Province. The intendancy  took control of government and military finances and had broad powers to promote the local economy.

Nineteenth century 

On September 15, 1821, in the Hall of Councils of the City of Mérida, Yucatán declared its independence from Spain. Almost immediately, Governor Juan María Echeverri sent two representatives to negotiate the incorporation of Yucatán into the  Mexican Empire. The incorporation into the Mexican Empire took place on November 2, 1821.

Society

Religion

The letters patent of 8 December 1526, granted to Francisco de Montejo for the conquest of the Yucatan peninsula, incorporated various provisions designed to ensure the successful conversion of Mayan residents to (Roman Catholic) Christianity.<ref
group=note>Among these were the–
 imposition of diezmos or tithes for the maintenance of the Roman Catholic Church ,
 appointment of a bishop within five years ,
 enslavement of Mayan residents who refused compliance with the Requerimiento ,
 prohibition from entry to Spanish Yucatan by non-Christians and Christian heretics, including Jews, Moors and Lutherans ,
 appointment of at least two secular clergy to accompany reconnaissance, trade, conquest, and settlement expeditions .
</ref> Christian proselytising efforts in the Yucatan peninsula were begun in late September 1527 by secular friars Juan Rodríguez de Caraveo, Pedro Fernández, and Carmelite friar Gregorio de San Martín, who accompanied the Montejo entrada of 1527–1528.<ref
group=note>Jerónimo de Aguilar, a Franciscan friar, had been resident in the pre-Columbian Ekab Province from 1511 to late February 1519, but is not known to have engaged in missionary work, having been a slave or servant of the batab or mayor of Xaman Ha' .
</ref> The first known Christian baptisms in the peninsula occurred in Ekab, capital of the eponymous Postclassic Mayan province, during or shortly after an assembly of the province's batabo'ob or mayors, held at some point during December 1527 and March 1528. Franciscans began missionary work in Chak'anputun, capital of a Postclassic Mayan province of the same name, sometime during 1535 and 1537.<ref
group=note>Reputedly, at the initiative of Jacobo de Testera, custodian of the Franciscan Order in New Spain . The first mission, believed to have been composed of Testera and four companions, was expelled by a military expedition under Lorenzo de Godoy . Testera sent a second mission to Spanish Yucatan in 1542. This latter mission, composed of four friars (Luis de Villalpando, Lorenzo de Bienvenida, Melchor de Benavente, and Juan de Herrera), arrived in 1545, and proved more enduring than the first . An additional four Franciscan friars (Nicolás de Albalate, Angel Maldonado, Miguel de Vera, Juan de la Puerta) arrived in 1546 or 1547, and a further eight (including Francisco de Bustamante and Diego de Landa) in 1549 . The Franciscans held their first chapter meeting on 29 September 1549, and were established as a province in 1561 (with Landa as the first provincial superior) . Non-Franciscan regular clergy were prohibited from missionary work in Spanish Yucatan sometime thereafter .
</ref>

Education

Hispano–Christian schooling or indoctrination of Mayan children and adults was begun by Franciscan friars at the Provincial Convent of St. Francis, Merida, in 1547.<ref
group=note>An assembly of the municipality's batabo'ob or mayors was held in Merida in early 1547, during which these were invited to send their children to the Franciscan school in town, though at least some children were rather sent to said school by encomenderos .
</ref><ref
group=note>The convent, Convento Provincial de San Francisco, was demolished in 1869 .
</ref> Instruction included–
 Roman Catholic doctrine for all Mayan children and adults,<ref
group=note>Attendance for doctrinal studies was compulsory at least for Mayan adults .
</ref>
 (Latin) reading and writing for children of pre-eminent Mayan families,
 choral music for Mayan adults.

At least some chilamo'ob or priests (of Mayan polytheism), and members of ch'ibalo'ob or noble houses, are known to have vigorously opposed Franciscan indoctrination.

Government

Capitulaciones de conquista of 1526

The capitulaciones de conquista or letters patent for the conquest of Yucatan, granted on 8 December 1526 by Charles I of Spain to Francisco de Montejo in Granada, set out the first constitution of Spanish Yucatan.<ref
group=note>In addition to Spanish civil law, including a real provisión or royal ordinance of 17 November 1526 regulating New World conquests (incorporated by reference in Montejo's latters patent), and the Spanish Requerimiento  .
</ref><ref
</ref>

Absolute authority was vested in the Spanish sovereign, advised and assisted by the Casa de Contratación and the Council of the Indies.<ref
group=note>Though absolute power over spiritual matters rested with the Roman Catholic pontiff .
</ref> Directly subordinate was the adelantado, governor, captain general, and alguacil mayor of Yucatan, who was afforded executive, legislative and judicial authority over the province.<ref
group=note>Though oficiales reales or royal officers, appointed by and responsible to the Spanish sovereign, administered part of the province's treasury .
</ref> Spanish Yucatan was partitioned into municipios or municipalities, each administered by a designated cabildo or municipal-and-town council.<ref
</ref> Said municipalities were further subdivided into–
 Mayan or encomienda settlements, administered by an encomendero and a resident batab, cacique or mayor,<ref
</ref>
 Spanish or non-encomienda settlements, administered by a cabildo.

Early developments

The Real Audiencia of Mexico, established by real cédula or royal decree on 13 December 1527, was thereby set up as a superior court of judicature for Spanish Yucatan.<ref
group=note>The Real Audiencia of Guatemala, established by real cédula or royal decree on 20 November 1542, held jurisdiction over Spanish Yucatan from–
 13 September 1543 to 23 April 1548, 
 7 July 1550 to 8 September 1563, 
 16 October 1814 to 27 September 1821.
Furthermore, it exercised de facto authority over Spanish Yucatan from 24 April 1548 to 6 July 1550 .
</ref> The province was made an administrative district of the Viceroyalty of New Spain upon or shortly after the latter's formation on 17 April 1535.<ref
group=note>Antonio de Mendoza y Pacheco was appointed viceroy of New Spain on 17 April 1535, but did not assume office until 14 November 1535 .
</ref><ref
group=note>Spanish Yucatan was made a province of New Spain prior to 1553 . A real cédula or royal decree of 23 April 1548 directed the viceroy to oversee the adoption of a number of measures regarding Mayan residents of the province .
</ref> The New Laws of 20 November 1542 rendered null and void some parts of the adelantado'''s letters patent. The latter were further derogated from on 13 May 1549, upon the adelantado's suspension from the offices of governor, captain general, and alguacil mayor of Spanish Yucatan.

Economy

Capitulaciones de conquista of 1526

Francisco de Montejo's letters patent of 8 December 1526 incorporated a number of provisions designed to attract Spanish settlers to the Yucatan peninsula, including–
 assignment of conquered Mayan settlements in encomiendas,
 authorisation for a limited slave trade in Mayan prisoners,<ref
group=note>The New Laws of 20 November 1542 forbade said trade .
</ref>
 partial tax breaks from the quinto real, almojarifazgo, and salt tax,
 grants of two caballerías and two solares,
 authorisation to employ court fines for local public works,
 authorisation to employ the diezmo for local missionary work.

Early developments

Conquistadors had initially hoped to find significant deposits of gold and precious metals in the Yucatan peninsula. As the conquest wore on, it became increasingly apparent that none such were to be had. Consequently, agriculture was settled on as the primary economic activity of Spanish Yucatan.<ref
group=note>Old World flora and fauna were introduced during the Spanish conquest, notably including draught and farm animals, crops (eg cabbages, lettuces, turnips, onions, sugar cane), and fruit trees (eg citruses, figs, pomegranates, dates, coconuts, plantains, sapodillas) . These did not displace the Mesoamerican staples (eg turkeys, cotton, maize, squash, beans, peppers) . See, for instance, the Columbian exchange.
</ref> Some commerce, especially in dye woods, similarly developed.<ref
group=note>At least some Postclassic Mayan industries (including salt, beeswax, and cotton textile production) were maintained . Regarding dye woods, conquistador Marcos de Ayala is believed to have introduced the native logwood dye to the Spanish market, while Hernando de Bracamonte is credited with the introduction of the Old World indigo dye to the peninsula .
</ref>

Mayan cotton mantas were made legal tender in late 1542.

Legacy

See also
 History of Belize
 History of Central America
 History of Mexico
 Republic of Yucatan – nineteenth-century sovereign state in the Yucatan peninsula
 Caste War of Yucatan – nineteenth–century Hispano–Mayan conflict in the Yucatan peninsula

Notes

Citations

 References  

 
 
 
 
 
 
 
 
 
 
 
 
 
 
 
 
 
 
 
 
 
 
 
 
 
 
 
 
 
 
 
 
 
 
 
 
 
 
 
 
 
 
 
 
 
 
 
 
 
 
 
 
 
 
 
 
 
 
 
 
 
 
 
 
 
 
 

Further reading
 Farriss, Nancy M. Maya Society Under Colonial Rule. Princeton, NJ: Princeton University Press, 1984. .
 Moseley, Edward H. "From Conquest to Independence: Yucatan Under Spanish Rule, 1521-1821" in Yucatan: A World Apart. Tuscaloosa, AL: University of Alabama Press, 1980. .
 Patch, Robert W. Maya and Spaniard in Yucatan, 1648-1812''. Stanford, CA: Stanford University Press, 1993. .

New Spain
Colonial Mexico
Yucatan
1617 establishments in New Spain
History of the Yucatán Peninsula
Spanish-speaking countries and territories